Qasa' Haliyan is a sub-district located in Al Udayn District, Ibb Governorate, Yemen. Qasa' Haliyan had a population of 9118 as of 2004.

References 

Sub-districts in Al Udayn District